Friendship is a 2021 Indian Tamil-language sports comedy action film directed by John Paul Raj and Sham Surya. A remake of the 2018 Malayalam film Queen, the film stars Arjun, Harbhajan Singh, Losliya Mariyanesan, Sathish. It marks the acting debut of Harbajan Singh and Losliya Mariyanesan, after the latter's stint at Bigg Boss Tamil. The film was released on 17 September 2021.

Cast 
 Arjun as Lawyer Sylender
 Harbhajan Singh as Bhagat Singh aka Bhajji
 Losliya Mariyanesan as Anitha
 Sathish as Jeeva
 Kuttikara Rajesh Saudi as Doctor 
 M. S. Bhaskar as Advocate Chanakyan
 J. Satish Kumar
 Venkat Subha
 Monika Thomas Puthuran as Madhu 
 Robin Prabhu as Prabu 
 KPY Bala as Browny
 Pala. Karuppiah as Judge

Production 
The principal photography of the film began in March 2020.

Casting 
Harbhajan was chosen to play the main lead role after becoming popular in the state of Tamil Nadu since playing for Chennai Super Kings (CSK) in the Indian Premier League. He often interacted with Tamil spectators while playing for CSK and apparently was offered the role to portray a college student from Punjab in the film. It is also the first time that an Indian high-profile cricketer is set to play the main lead role in an Indian film.

Sri Lankan news anchor Losliya Mariyanesan who rose to prominence after taking part in the Bigg Boss Tamil 3 reality television show aired on Star Vijay was signed on as the female lead role opposite Singh. In February 2020, Arjun Sarja signed on to play a role in the film while Satish was chosen to play the supporting role of the friend of Singh's character.

Release 
The film was released on 17 September 2021 in theatres.

Soundtrack 

The first single of the film, titled Superstar Anthem and sung by actor Silambarasan, was released on YouTube coinciding with the birthday of Harbhajan Singh on 3 July 2020. It was revealed that the single was crooned as a tribute to Rajnikanth.

References 

Indian romantic comedy-drama films
Indian sports comedy-drama films
2020s Tamil-language films
2021 films